Jean-Pierre Marionex (22 April 1937 – 6 April 2007) was a Belgian field hockey player. He competed in the men's tournament at the 1960 Summer Olympics.

References

External links
 

1937 births
2007 deaths
Belgian male field hockey players
Olympic field hockey players of Belgium
Field hockey players at the 1960 Summer Olympics
People from Ixelles
Field hockey players from Brussels